POPOP or 1,4-bis(5-phenyloxazol-2-yl) benzene is a scintillator.  It is used as a wavelength shifter (also called a "secondary scintillator"), which means that it converts shorter wavelength light to longer wavelength light.  Its output spectrum peaks at 410 nm, which is violet.  POPOP is used in both solid and liquid organic scintillators.

References 

Phosphors and scintillators
Oxazoles